Grasz czy nie grasz is the Polish version of Deal or No Deal. It was shown at 7:00pm CET on Saturdays on Polsat. Zygmunt Chajzer was the original host. In its third year, the studio and graphics were updated, as they were to other international versions of the show.

Gameplay

2005 to 2006

Question round 
250 contenders were split into two teams of 125 players each. After a trivia question round, one of the two teams remains to be split into five teams of 25. After another quiz round, one of these teams - along with one more contender selected at random from the 225 remaining contenders - will proceed to the third trivia round.  These 26 competitors must answer 5 more questions, each with 4 possible answers. Contestants who choose the right answer receive 1 point for each player who answered incorrectly. The others receive nothing. Two top scorers go to the next round.

Second round 
The two remaining contestants face each other at a single showdown-style podium with two buzzers on it. They must decide whether or not to press the button. The contestant buzzed in receive prize in a "mystery case", usually worth less than 10,000 PLN. The other move on to the final. A math problem is asked if nobody buzz in. The contestant buzz first and calculate correctly proceeds to the final. Before the final, the winner must choose a case.

Final 
25 contestants who had lost in the first two rounds each held a briefcase numbered from 1 to 26. If the main contestant chooses a case, the player who held it must guess the value in the case, and win 1,000 PLN multiplied by the number of remaining cases if guessed correctly. The main contestant also can call a friend who was chosen by him, but only to accept or reject the bank offer.

2006 to 2007

Preliminary round 
The show calls two contestants chosen in random, who played in a SMS competition. In order to choose a winner, contestants must answer a question correctly to proceed to the final. They can buzz in if they know the answer before the host finishes reading out the answers. An incorrect answer can cause the contestant to lose the game.

Final 
The contestant who win the preliminary round chooses one of 26 cases with values from 1 grosz to 1,000,000 PLN (see below). The chosen case is opened only at the end of the show. In the studio, four friends (who had chosen by the contestant) can give their advises to him at every stage of the final.

Contestant started the game nominating among the remaining 25 suitcases what will be opened. The amounts, which are revealed in the chosen cases, disappear from the board, and can not be found in the contestant's case. After the player opens 6 cases, the banker, who make a proposal to buy the contestant's case for a certain sum of money, calls the host. The bank offer depends on what amounts still remain on the board – the higher value remains, the higher is the bank offer. If the contestant accepts the offer, they win his offered amount and open their case – which was sold to the banker – then the program comes to its end.

If the contestant rejects the offer, they will continue on playing and opens another suitcase. After the player opens 5 cases, the banker makes an offer again, and respectively, 4, 3, and 2 cases. When the studio remains 6 cases, the contestant picks a case to open, and the banker makes an offer after each chosen case. When there are 2 cases remaining (including the player's case), the bank makes their last offer. If the contestant rejects this offer, they win the value in their case and the game ends.

To win the grand prize, contestants must select the case had the million złotych and reject all the banker's offers.

Specials 
A Christmas special was aired on 23 December 2006. The celebrity contestants are Elżbieta Zającówna, Agata Młynarska, Małgorzata Foremniak, Krzysztof Ibisz, Piotr Gąsowski and Robert Chojnacki. They took the offer of 365,000 PLN, with 2 values 300,000 PLN and 400,000 PLN remaining. Total winnings are donated to the Polsat Foundation on the new ENT Clinic building in Poznan. The case had the 300,000 PLN.

Records 
 Małgorzata Podgórska-Paciorek, on 28 October 2006, made the history of the show. She took the bank offer of 400,000 PLN, with only 2 values remaining: 0.01 PLN and 1,000,000 PLN. He had the 0.01 PLN in his case.
 Another contestant, on 18 March 2006, leave the studio with only 0.01 PLN (a grosz is a counterpart of a cent/penny).
 The contestant played on 21 September 2006 is a priest. The priest accepted the 220,000 PLN offer, with 50,000 PLN and 500,000 PLN remaining. His case contained the 50,000 PLN.
 The highest banker offer in the 2005-2006 period was 550,000 PLN, the 2006-2007 period: 770,000 PLN.

Unusual moments 
 On 7 April 2007, a contestant played a risky game. She wanted to play on, but didn't need her anymore. She took the offer of 12,000 PLN, with 10 PLN and 30,000 PLN remaining. The case contained 10 PLN.
 A contestant (named Peter) broke the banker's phone on 18 November 2006.
 In the talkshow Kuba Wojewódzki, the host Zygmunt Chajzer revealed a special moment in Grasz czy nie grasz: on 22 October 2005, a contestant chose a suitcase which had the million złotych, but then gave up and accepted the 115,000 PLN bank offer.
 On 30 December 2006, the banker suggested a 0 PLN suitcase, as the host doesn't receive a phone call from him. The case has 50 PLN.
 On 6 May 2006, an unlucky contestant chose many suitcases with high amounts, so later he had 10 cases with low amounts. When he has 3 cases remaining, the host told him that if the contestant guessed the value hidden in his case, he would win 2,000 PLN. But he guessed incorrectly and lost the 2,000 PLN. Later the host told him again that the contestant could win 1,000 PLN if he guessed the amount in his case. He lost again and left with 10 PLN.

Case values

2005 to 2006

2006 to 2007

Gallery

Polish game shows
Deal or No Deal
2004 Polish television series debuts
2006 Polish television series endings
2000s Polish television series
Polsat original programming